Bromocresol purple (BCP) or 5′,5″-dibromo-o-cresolsulfophthalein, is a dye of the triphenylmethane family (triarylmethane dyes) and a pH indicator. It is colored yellow below pH 5.2, and violet above pH 6.8. In its cyclic sulfonate ester form, it has a pKa value of 6.3, and is usually prepared as a 0.04% aqueous solution.

Uses

Bromocresol purple is used in medical laboratories to measure albumin. Use of BCP in this application may provide some advantage over older methods using bromocresol green. In microbiology, it is used for staining dead cells based on their acidity, and for the isolation and assaying of lactic acid bacteria.

In photographic processing, it can be used as an additive to acid stop baths to indicate that the bath has reached neutral pH and needs to be replaced.

Bromocresol purple milk solids glucose agar is used as a medium used to distinguish dermatophytes from bacteria and other organisms in cases of ringworm fungus (T. verrucosum) infestation in cattle and other animals.

pH Indicator
Similar to bromocresol green, the structure of bromocresol purple changes with pH. Changing the level of acidity causes a shift in the equilibrium between two different structures that have different colors. In near-neutral or alkaline solution, the chemical has a sulfonate structure that gives the solution a purple color. As the pH decreases, it converts to a sultone (cyclic sulfonic ester) that colors the solution yellow.  In some microbiology tests, this change is used as an indicator of bacterial growth.

See also
 Metacresol purple

References

External links

Material Safety Data Sheet

PH indicators
Triarylmethane dyes
Phenol dyes
Bromoarenes
Benzoxathioles